Augusto Martelli (15 March 1940 – 3 November 2014) was an Italian composer, conductor, arranger  and television personality.

Born in Genoa, the son of conductor and composer Giordano Bruno Martelli, Martelli is probably best known for the song Djamballà, the theme song of the 1970 film Il dio serpente, which reached the first position in the Italian charts. He is also well known for his romantic and professional relationship with pop singer Mina, with whom he collaborated as a composer and an arranger and with whom he co-founded the music label PDU. After having been conductor in a number of RAI variety shows, starting from late seventies Martelli was also host of a number of TV programs, mainly for Canale 5. He also composed songs and scores for a large number of Fininvest TV programs, including the jazz-fusion instrumental piece "Round D Minor" for the motor racing show "Grand Prix" hosted by Andrea de Adamich in the 1980s.

Selected filmography

 Pensando a te (1969)
 More Dollars for the MacGregors (1970)
 Il dio serpente (1970)
 Sartana in the Valley of Death (1970)
 The Wind's Fierce (1970) 
 We Are All in Temporary Liberty (1971)

References

External links

 
 

1940 births
Musicians from Genoa
2014 deaths
Italian music arrangers
Italian conductors (music)
Italian male conductors (music)
Italian composers
Italian male composers
Italian bandleaders
Italian pop musicians
Italian jazz musicians
Italian jazz pianists
Italian television presenters
20th-century Italian musicians
20th-century Italian male musicians
Mass media people from Genoa